The Mr. Potato Head Show is an American children's television series loosely based on the toyline of the same name by American toy company Hasbro. It aired on Fox as part of its Fox Kids programming block from September 12, 1998 to February 16, 1999.

Production
The Mr. Potato Head Show was developed by Dan Clark and Doug Langdale. The puppet characters were created by The Chiodo Brothers. Mark Bryan Wilson served as the show's puppet master while William Traetta served as the show's assistant puppet master.

The series was considered lost for many years until Lost Media Wiki members Paroos and Luray found all the episodes of the series online. As of December 18, 2016, the series has resurfaced.

Premise
Throughout the series, Mr. Potato Head always puts on a TV episode with the help of his Kitchen Crew and presents each episode to the TV Guys so that they can air them on television. During production on each episode, Mr. Potato Head and his Kitchen Crew have various misadventures.

Characters

Kitchen Crew
 Mr. Potato Head (performed by Kevin Carlson) – The main protagonist of the series. He is an anthropomorphic potato who serves as the leader of the Kitchen Crew where they make different shows in his studio for the TV Guys. He’s often referred to as “P.H.” by his friends and colleagues throughout the show.
 Baloney (performed by Greg Ballora) – An anthropomorphic stack of baloney who is Mr. Potato Head’s best friend. He often serves as the voice of reason for the Kitchen Crew on some occasions and is also Mr. Potato Head's personal assistant.
 Queenie Sweet Potato (performed by Debra Wilson) – An anthropomorphic sweet potato who serves as the Kitchen Crew's diva. She’s gifted with an amazing voice and is viewed by most of the crew, especially by Mr. Potato Head, as the most talented performer in the bunch. Queenie's love for sugar cream pies and her crush on Leonardo DiCaprio are both brought up numerous times throughout the series.
 Potato Bug (performed by Julianne Buescher) – A female potato bug. Potato Bug is largely considered to be the oddball of the Kitchen Crew, stemming from her wacky personality and various quirks (i.e. believing that goblins deliver the newspaper every morning; mistaking the term “scapegoat” for an actual animal; talking to shoes like they’re people; having a fascination for the undersides of tables, etc). While being portrayed as somewhat oblivious, Potato Bug is energetic, kind, fiercely loyal to her friends, and unabashedly herself.
 Canny (performed by James Murray) – A dog made out of dog food cans and Mr Potato Head’s pet. In "Not With a Bang" Part 1, it is revealed that Canny used to work as a University Physics Professor.
 Johnny Rotten Apple (performed by James Murray) – An anthropomorphic rotten apple who serves as the Kitchen Crew's residential musician with a rock star personality. In most of his appearances, he would sing about a random character or other things, like cheese or cultural diversity. Johnny Rotten Apple's name is a spoof of the stage name of John Lydon. In the episode "Aliens Dig Baloney," it is revealed that he is allergic to yogurt.
 Dr. Fruitcake (performed by James Murray) – An anthropomorphic fruitcake who serves as the Kitchen Crew's residential mad scientist. He is the creator of Ham Monster and often comes up with different inventions to help Mr. Potato Head in his episodes.
 Ham Monster (performed by Mark Bryan Wilson) – A monster made out of ham (hence the name), crab claws, and chicken drumsticks who was created by Dr. Fruitcake. When he first appeared in the episode "Aliens Dig Baloney," Dr. Fruitcake created Ham Monster for Mr. Potato Head's monster episode only to go berserk across the studio. Using the secret of making ham explode that he learned from the aliens, Baloney destroyed Ham Monster by making him explode. In the episode "Royal Pain," Ham Monster was rebuilt where he now has the brain of a 2-year-old child which makes him more obedient to Dr. Fruitcake. When Baloney started to ask where Dr. Fruitcake got the brain of a 2-year-old child, Dr. Fruitcake cuts his question off by stating "Trust me Baloney, you don't want to know!"
 Mr. Giblets (performed by James Murray) – An anthropomorphic pile of giblets with a disturbing admiration for anything macabre or creepy which makes other members of the Kitchen Crew uncomfortable. In "Not With A Bang" Part 1, he tries to run for a position in government by making, as he says, “hollow campaign promises” that the crowd actually believes.
 Mr. Happy Whip (performed by Brian Jacobs) – An anthropomorphic whipped cream spray who would emit whipped cream when scared.
 Miss Licorice Lips (voiced by Debra Wilson) – A talking pair of computer-animated lips made of black licorice that serves as the announcer and narrator for Mr. Potato Head's episodes.

Supporting characters
 TV Guys (portrayed by Brian Jacobs and Lisa Kaplan) – Aron and Nora are television executives working at a television company that airs Mr. Potato Head's show. They would tell Mr. Potato Head about his recent show submissions and tell him what they want him to do on his show. Between the two of them, Nora is the more vocal executive while Aron is more of the quiet, right-hand man to Nora. A catchphrase used by the executives (more commonly by Nora) whenever Mr. Potato Head tries to explain a situation to them or whenever he says something simple and straightforward, they’ll laugh and say "I don't know what that means, but I love it!"
 The Writer (portrayed by Doug Langdale) – An unnamed human who serves as the screenwriter for episodes of Mr. Potato Head's show. He does his job inside his closet and is always seen with a bagel in his mouth.
 Betty the Kitchen Fairy (voiced by Julianne Buescher) – An animated fairy who uses a ladle as her wand. She usually pops in to give the Kitchen Crew advice on how to get through their plights even when they're in an unrelated dangerous situation. In the episode "The Thing in the Microwave", it’s shown that she has the ability to freeze time.

Other characters
 Aliens (performed by Kevin Carlson and James Murray) – An unidentified alien race. In "Aliens Dig Baloney," the aliens arrive on Earth to find a new leader for their galactic empire to which they end up meeting and teaching Baloney the secret on how to make ham explode. In "Smart Attack", the aliens obtain the ghost of Mr. Potato Head's plant as their new leader. In "Not With a Bang" Part 1, a representative of the aliens poses as the TV Guys' smirking boss (also portrayed by James Murray) in order to get Mr. Potato Head's show cancelled and place Donkey Waddlefoot's show in its spot. This was part of a plan by Emperor Ghost Plant to invade Earth. In "Not With a Bang" Part 2, the aliens begin their invasion of Earth where they engage the Kitchen Crew. With help from Betty the Kitchen Fairy, the aliens were repelled upon being chased off by Blostrogath the Destroyer. Mr. Potato Head then confronts the alien representative at the TV Guys' station who sheds his disguise, admits defeat by stating that invading Earth was not a good idea, and then takes his leave from Earth.
 Blostrogath the Destroyer (voiced by James Murray) – An animated ancient evil monster who was imprisoned in a bag of 65,000,000-year-old popcorn. In the episode "The Thing in the Microwave," Queenie Sweet Potato accidentally freed him when his bag was put in the microwave where he begins his plan to destroy Earth and everything. After being told to be herself by Betty the Kitchen Fairy, Queenie evades Blostrogath's attacks as Mr. Potato Head (as Spudman) summons Jr spud squad to help defeat Blostrogath upon being tricked into the microwave. In "Not With a Bang" Part 2, Betty the Kitchen Fairy summoned Blostrogath to chase away the invading alien armada.
 Donkey Waddlefoot - An unseen character who is Mr. Potato Head's rival in television entertainment.

Cast
 Brian Jacobs as Aron
 Lisa Kaplan as Nora
 Doug Langdale as The Writer
 Lee Arenberg as Bullyboy (ep. 8)
 Julianne Buescher as Flower Lady (ep. 10)
 James Murray as The Smirking Man (ep. 12-13)

Puppeteers
 Kevin Carlson as Mr. Potato Head, Alien (ep. 1, 11-13)
 Greg Ballora as Baloney
 Julianne Buescher as Potato Bug, Betty the Kitchen Fairy
 Brian Jacobs as Mr. Happy Whip
 James Murray as Dr. Fruitcake, Johnny Rotten Apple, Mr. Giblets, Alien (ep. 1, 11-13), Blostrogath the Destroyer (ep. 3, 13)
 Debra Wilson as Queenie Sweet Potato, Miss Licorice Lips
 Mark Bryan Wilson as Ham Monster

Assistant puppeteers
 Brad Abrell
 Donna Kimball
 Alison Mork
 William Traetta

Episodes

References

External links
 
 

Mr. Potato Head
1990s American children's comedy television series
1998 American television series debuts
1999 American television series endings
American television series with live action and animation
American television shows featuring puppetry
English-language television shows
Fox Kids
Television series about television
Television series by Claster Television
Television series by Film Roman
Television shows based on Hasbro toys